Alexander Pope (1688–1744) was an English poet.

Alexander Pope may also refer to:

 Alexander Pope (actor) (1763–1835), Irish actor and painter
 Alexander Pope, Jr. (1849–1924), American sporting artist
 Alexander Pope (Texas politician), see Twentieth Texas Legislature and Twenty-first Texas Legislature

See also
Pope Alexander (disambiguation)